John Beasley Smith (September 27, 1901 – May 14, 1968) was an American composer and big band musician.  "That Lucky Old Sun" (1949) one of his better known works, was covered by many well-known artists.  He often worked with Haven Gillespie and toured the nation with his group, "Beasley Smith and His Orchestra".

Biography

Beasley Smith was born in McEwen, Tennessee. His parents were teachers.  The family moved to Nashville when he was in elementary school.  While in high school at Hume-Fogg in downtown Nashville, he formed an instrumental duo with fellow piano prodigy Francis Craig.  They were later roommates at Vanderbilt University.

Smith left college after two years to become a musician. He formed his first band around 1922, and by 1925 the Beasley Smith Orchestra was entertaining regularly at the Andrew Jackson Hotel in downtown Nashville.  From 1927-1933, the group toured nationally. On October 5, 1925, both Smith and Craig performed with their bands during the opening-day broadcasts of radio station WSM.

Wearying of the road, Smith accepted the job of music director at WSM in 1933.  He starred on such radio shows as Mr. Smith Goes to Town, Sunday Down South and Tin Pan Valley.  Lead vocalists who worked with Smith's band during his heyday included Snooky Lanson, Dottie Dillard, Kitty Kallen, and Dinah Shore.  When Nashville started to become a recording center in the 1940s, Smith and Owen Bradley were key figures in assembling musicians for studio sessions.

Smith began to blossom as a songwriter in the 1940s.  He and Owen Bradley co-wrote "Night Train to Memphis" with Marvin Hughes.  Roy Acuff sang the original version in 1942, and the upbeat song has been recorded consistently ever since.  Beasley Smith and Francis Craig co-wrote "Beg Your Pardon," and it became the 1948 follow-up hit to "Near You" for Craig's band.  "That Lucky Old Sun" (1949), co-written with Haven Gillespie was a million-seller for Frankie Laine and is now considered a pop-music standard.

In 1953, Smith left WSM to become the A&R director and musical arranger for Dot Records.  He and Dot founder, Randy Wood, also incorporated the Randy-Smith Music Publishing Company.  Beasley Smith had written more than 100 songs by the time of his death in Nashville, Tennessee in 1968.

In 1983, Beasley Smith was inducted into the Nashville Songwriters Hall of Fame.

References

External links

http://nashvillesongwritersfoundation.com.s164288.gridserver.com/Site/inductee?entry_id=2839

1901 births
1968 deaths
American male composers
People from Humphreys County, Tennessee
20th-century American composers
20th-century American male musicians